Acro-oto-radial syndrome, also known as Pseudopapilledema blepharophimosis hand anomalies syndrome is a very rare hereditary disorder which is characterized by pseudopapilledema, hearing loss, cranio-facial dysmorphisms and hand/foot anomalies. Unlike other genetic syndromes, people with this syndrome don't exhibit intellectual disabilities. Only 4 cases have been reported in medical literature.

Description 

People with this disorder often have the following symptoms:

 Pseudopapilledema
 Hearing loss
 Microcephaly
 Down-slanting palpebral fissures
 Broad nose
 Micrognathia
 Ear malformations
 Generalized shortness of digits
 Thenar and hypothenar eminence hypoplasia
 Hallux varus
 Foot syndactyly

Cases 

The following is the list of all cases of acro-oto-radial syndrome reported in medical literature:

 1991: Paes-Alves et al. describes 3 affected members of 2 consanguineous sibships from the same large family in Bahia, Brazil with the symptoms mentioned above. They propose this case to be part of a novel autosomal recessive malformation syndrome.

 1997: Bertola et al. describes a 23-year-old patient born to consanguineous parents with the symptoms mentioned above. They conclude that this is also part of the same syndrome reported by Paes-Alves and suggest a name for the syndrome (acro-oto-radial syndrome)

References 

Rare genetic syndromes
Hearing loss with craniofacial syndromes
Syndromes with microcephaly